"Cinderella" is a song by American singer Lionel Richie. It was written and produced by Richie along with Joe Wolfe for his sixth studio album Renaissance (2000). The latin pop song was released as the album's third single in Continental Europe in the second quartet of 2001. A minor commercial success, it peaked within the top fifty of the Swiss Singles Chart, while also reaching the charts in Germany and the Netherlands.

Track listings

Notes
 signifies a co-producer

Credits and personnel
Credits adapted from the album's liner notes.

 Alex Al – bass
 Gary Bias – horns 
 Raymond Brown – horns, horns arrangement
 Gerald Cox – background vocals
 Jared Douglas – background vocals
 James Hoover – engineering assistant
 Paul Jackson, Jr. – guitar
 Lionel Richie – producer, vocals, writer
 Michael Stewart – horns
 Dirk Vanoucek – recording
 Kelly Wendall – horns
 Joe Wolfe – keyboards, producer, programming, writer
 Reginald Young – horns
 Wassim Zriek – engineering assistant

Charts

References

2001 singles
Lionel Richie songs
Songs written by Lionel Richie
2000 songs